Allan is a town in west central Saskatchewan, Canada, about 65 kilometres south-east of Saskatoon.

History
Allan was incorporated as a village on June 9, 1910, though the first homesteaders, consisting of nine families travelling together, first started arriving in 1903. It was incorporated as a town in 1965. Those nine families finally settled in what is now the district of Allan in early June 1903 after rejecting several previous land claims with which they were unhappy.

Sports and recreation

Allan & District Communiplex 
The town of Allan renamed the hockey rink in the Allan & District Communiplex to the Logan Schatz Memorial Rink in 2019.  This was done in remembrance to Logan Schatz, the Humboldt Broncos captain who was from Allan and died in the Humboldt Broncos bus crash. Schatz is remembered as a natural leader, a good skater, and will be forever remembered by Allan and its surrounding communities.

Allan has a senior men's hockey team, called the Allan Flames.

Allan Swimming Pool 
Allan Swimming Pool is a seasonal outdoor pool in Allan that operates from mid-June through September long weekend. The pool offers various swimming activities and programming from public swimming, Red Cross Swimming Lessons, and Royal LifeSaving Society Bronze Star, Medallion & Cross Program.

Allan Golf & Country Club
Allan Golf & Country Club is a 9-hole golf course in Allan that was opened in 1959.

Culture

Allan Community Heritage Society and Museum 
Allan Community Heritage Society and Museum, housed in two buildings, is a free-to-access seasonal museum open from mid-May through mid-September. The displays change every year thanks to families in the community and surrounding areas who donate artifacts and items, and they have collected over 3000 photographs from families within the local area.

Transportation
Allan is located about 10 kilometres south of Estlow (which is on Highway 16) at the confluences of Highways 397, 763, and 764.

Just over 14 kilometres south of town, in the RM of Blucher, is the Allan Aerodrome.

The Canadian National Railway runs along the south side of town.

Education 
Allan Composite School, ran by Prairie Spirit School Division, offers schooling from PreKindergarten to Grade 12.

Demographics 

Notable people
Jared Cowen – Professional hockey player

See also

 List of communities in Saskatchewan
 List of towns in Saskatchewan

References

External links

Towns in Saskatchewan
Division No. 11, Saskatchewan